Héliopolis is a 2021 Algerian drama film directed by Djafar Gacem. It was selected as the Algerian entry for the Best International Feature Film at the 93rd Academy Awards but was withdrawn after the film's national premiere was canceled due to COVID-19. The filmmakers announced their intention to compete the following year. In October 2021, it was again selected as the Algerian entry for the Best International Feature Film at the 94th Academy Awards.

Plot
In Guelma, Victory in Europe Day is a life-altering event for one Algerian family: French troops are about to commit a massacre against Algerian civilians.

See also
 List of submissions to the 93rd Academy Awards for Best International Feature Film
 List of submissions to the 94th Academy Awards for Best International Feature Film
 List of Algerian submissions for the Academy Award for Best International Feature Film

References

External links
 

2021 films
2021 drama films
Algerian drama films
2020s Arabic-language films
2020s French-language films
2021 multilingual films
Algerian multilingual films
Films set in Algeria
Films set in the French colonial empire